The University of New Mexico School of Law (UNM Law or New Mexico Law) is the law school of the University of New Mexico, a public research university in Albuquerque, New Mexico. Founded in 1947, it is the only law school in the state.

With approximately 300 students and 32 faculty, UNM Law has a student-to-faculty ratio of 5 to 1, among the best in the nation. An average of 100 students are enrolled annually, with an acceptance rate of 44 percent. The Juris Doctor (J.D.) program is a full-time day program requiring completion of 86 credit hours in three years. The school also offers dual degree J.D./Masters programs in Accounting, Latin American Studies, Business Administration, or Public Administration; a Master of Studies in Law (MSL); and certificates in Indian law and natural resources law. UNM Law maintains five full-time legal clinics and is unique in requiring the completion of a clinical course to graduate.

UNM Law has one of the highest student diversity indexes of any U.S. law school, with Hispanics as the largest minority group. The school was among the first to prioritize the enrollment of indigenous people and is recognized as the top law school for Native Americans, as well as the second-best law school for Hispanics. The Princeton Review ranked UNM Law sixth in providing the greatest resources for minority students. 

UNM School of Law is ranked 91st by U.S. News & World Report and tied for eighth in clinical training; it is particularly noted for its environmental law program. National Jurist ranked UNM Law among the top 30 "best value" law schools, based on criteria such as average indebtedness after graduation, student employment rates, and tuition costs. According to New Mexico's official ABA-required disclosures, 85.7% of the Class of 2021 obtained full-time, long-term, J.D.-required employment ten months after graduation.

Academics
In addition to standard doctrinal courses in subjects such as contracts and torts, UNM Law is known for its programs in clinical education, Indian law, and natural resources and environmental law. The in-house Clinical Law Program has been consistently recognized as among the best in the country; though clinical education is optional at most law schools, participation in the clinic is required of all UNM law students. The Indian Law Program includes a specialized program of study leading to a certificate in Indian Law, the Southwest Indian Law Clinic, and the faculty-edited Tribal Law Journal. The Natural Resources and Environmental Law Program includes a specialized program of study leading to a certificate in the field and the student-edited Natural Resources Journal.

UNM School of Law has a unique relationship with New Mexico's government. Under the terms of the state constitution, the dean of the law school is responsible for chairing the state's judicial selection process, including the Judicial Compensation Commission and serving on other boards, committees and commissions. Moreover, the School of Law has the primary responsibility for all judicial education within the state.

Exchange and study abroad programs
Study abroad opportunities are available with special UNM exchange programs in Mexico, Canada, and Tasmania. The law school also has an exchange program with the University of New Hampshire School of Law, which allows UNM students to study patent and intellectual property law at that school.

Admissions
Applications are reviewed by five-member admissions committee that makes the final decision on acceptance into the next fall's entering class. The committee is composed of three full-time faculty members, the assistant dean for admissions, and one third-year law student elected by the student body. The committee begins reviewing files near the end of the fall semester; but often a final decision is not made until late April. The committee considers quantifiable factors (LSAT and grade point average) and nonquantifiable factors (letters of recommendation, personal statement, and extracurricular activities) in making decisions; substantial preference is given to New Mexico residents. The committee also recognizes that special pre-law programs for minority and disadvantaged applicants provide valuable information about an applicant's ability to succeed in law school, and participation in such programs is taken into account.

Centers and institutes
 American Indian Law Center, Inc.: an independent center based at the law school that is the oldest existing Indian-controlled and operated legal and public policy organization in the country
 Guanajuato Summer Law Institute:
 UNM Mediation Training:
 UNM Institute of Public Law: a think tank devoted to the development of informed public policy and law for the state of New Mexico.
 The Utton Transboundary Resources Center: a center specializing in transboundary resource disputes
 Pre-law Summer Institute: a two-month program run by the AILC at the law school that prepares American Indian and Alaska Native individuals for law school by essentially replicating the first semester of law school.

Publications
 Natural Resources Journal
 New Mexico Law Review
 Tribal Law Journal
 United States–Mexico Law Journal (1993–2005)

Competitions and Moot Courts
Students may participate in the following competitions and moot courts at the law school:
 ABA Negotiation Competition
 American Intellectual Property Moot Court Competition
 Animal Law Moot Court Competition
 Environmental Moot Court Competition
 Health Law Moot Court Competition
 Hispanic National Bar Association Moot Court Competition
 Jessup International Moot Court Competition
 National Mock Trial Competition
 National Moot Court Competition
 National Native American Moot Court Competition

Campus
In 1971, the law school moved into its current building, designed by the architect Antoine Predock while he was working for George Wright & Associates. In 2002, the law school opened the Fred Hart wing, designed by architect Edward Mazria. The New Mexico Court of Appeals is located on campus, next door to the School of Law. The Court of Appeals and the School of Law have a symbiotic relationship with the judges using the law school's library and the students using the Court of Appeal's formal courtroom. Indeed, the Court of Appeals was designed for this use, with classrooms for law students adjacent to the formal courtroom.

The Native American Community Academy, a charter school, previously had grades 11-12 attend classes at UNM Middle School. All school buses to went to Wilson Middle School's campus, with grade 11-12 students transported to/from Wilson to the UNM Law building. In 2013 all grades moved to Building 232 of the former Albuquerque Indian School, the Employees' New Dormitory and Club.

Employment 
According to New Mexico's official ABA-required disclosures, 85.7% of the Class of 2021 obtained full-time, long-term, J.D.-required employment ten months after graduation. A slight majority of graduates (52%) were employed in law firms, followed by 16% in government and 10% in the public interest.

Costs
Tuition cost for a full-time in-state student (not including living expenses) for the 2021–2022 academic year was $9,100.06 per semester, or $18,201.20 total for the academic year. Tuition cost for a part-time in-state student, taking 10 credits per semester, for the 2018–2019 academic year was $7,274.80 per semester, or $14,549.60 per academic year. The total cost of attendance (indicating the cost of tuition, fees, and living expenses) at New Mexico for the 2021–2022 academic year was $34,021.20 or $56,126.20 for nonresidents. The Law School Transparency estimated debt-financed cost of attendance for three years is $120,833 for residents or $192,655 for non-residents.

Notable alumni
 Article III federal judges
 Joel M. Carson III (Class of 1997), circuit judge, United States Court of Appeals for the Tenth Circuit
 Curtis LeRoy Hansen (Class of 1961), senior judge, United States District Court for the District of New Mexico
 Jimmie V. Reyna (Class of 1978), circuit judge, United States Court of Appeals for the Federal Circuit
 Christina Armijo (Class of 1975), senior judge, United States District Court for the District of New Mexico
 Robert C. Brack (Class of 1978), judge, United States District Court for the District of New Mexico
 Kenneth J. Gonzales (Class of 1994), judge, United States District Court for the District of New Mexico
 Paul W. Grimm (Class of 1976), judge, United States District Court for the District of Maryland
 Politicians and government officials
Hector Balderas, New Mexico Attorney General, former New Mexico State Auditor and former state representative. (Class of 2001)
 Charles W. Blackwell, first ambassador of the Chickasaw Nation to the United States from 1995 until 2013, (Class of 1972)
 Paul Bloom (1939–2009), lawyer who recovered $6 billion for the United States Department of Energy.
 Brian Colon (Class of 2001)
 John EchoHawk, founder of Native American Rights Fund (NARF), (Class of 1970)
 David Iglesias (Class of 1984), Judge Advocate (JAG), at the Pentagon, member of the legal team that was the inspiration for the film A Few Good Men, United States Attorney for the District of New Mexico
 Georgene Louis, member of the New Mexico House of Representatives, (Class of 2004)
 Kathleen Kennedy Townsend (Class of 1978)
 Gary King (politician) (Class of 1984)
 Michelle Lujan Grisham (Class of 1987), 32nd Governor of New Mexico, United States Representative for New Mexico's 1st District (2013-2019)
 Ramona Villagomez Manglona (Class of 1996), chief judge, U.S. District Court for the Northern Mariana Islands, a United States territorial court, nominated by Barack H. Obama
 Thomas J. Mabry, 14th Governor of New Mexico
 Xochitl Torres Small, U.S. Representative for New Mexico's 2nd congressional district. 
 Gloria Tristani, member of the Federal Communications Commission (FCC), 1997–2001.
 Tom Udall (Class of 1977)
 John Wertheim (Class of 1995)
John Anthony Castro (Class of 2012) Candidate for U.S. Senate
Steven Schiff  (Class of 1972)
Jonathan Rothschild, Mayor of Tucson, Arizona, (Class of 1977)
Deb Haaland, U.S. Representative for New Mexico's 1st Congressional District and one of the first two Native American women elected to Congress.
Jacob Candelaria  first openly gay man elected to New Mexico Legislature, member of the New Mexico Senate, (Class of 2016) 
Supreme Court of New Mexico
 Edward L. Chavez (Class of 1981)
 Charles W. Daniels (Class of 1969)
 Thomas J. Mabry
 Petra Jimenez Maes (Class of 1973)
 Judith Nakamura (Class of 1989)
 Barbara J. Vigil (Class of 1985)
 Supreme Court of Guam
 Katherine Maraman (Class of 1976)
 Fictional
Kimbery Wexler, main character on the television series Better Call Saul

Notable faculty
 Current
 Christian G. Fritz 	
 Nathalie Martin
 Kevin K. Washburn
 Former 
 Norman Bay
 Charles W. Blackwell
 Vern Countryman
 Cruz Reynoso
 Suellyn Scarnecchia

References

External links
 

Antoine Predock buildings
Educational institutions established in 1947
Law schools in New Mexico
Law
1947 establishments in New Mexico